The  qualifying stage for the 1998 AFC U-16 Championship, an international youth football competition, was organised on the basis of nine groups. The winning team in each group went forward to the final tournament in Qatar, together with Qatar as host nation.

Group 1
All matches played in Bawsher, Muscat, Oman

Group 2
All matches played in Tabriz, Iran

Group 3
All matches played in Ha'il, Saudi Arabia

Group 4
All matches played in Hyderabad, India

Group 5
All matches played in Kathmandu, Nepal

Group 6
All matches played in Tashkent, Uzbekistan

Group 7
All matches played in Chengdu, China

Group 8
All matches played in Yangon, Myanmar

Group 9
All matches played in Chon Buri, Thailand

Qualified teams

 (host)

Sources
rsssf.com

Qual
AFC U-16 Championship qualification
U-16 Championship qualification